This is a complete episode list for the Australian children's television series The Sleepover Club. Two series have been developed to date with each series consisting of twenty-six episodes. Numerous DVDs have been released including complete series, also including the series created by the season 2 girls.

Series overview
{| class="wikitable"
|-
! colspan="2" rowspan="2" |Seasons
! rowspan="2" |Episodes
! colspan="2" |Originally aired
|-
! First aired
! Last aired
|-
| style="background:#73C2FB; color:#73C2FB text-align:center;"| 
| style="text-align:center;"| 1
| style="text-align:center;"| 26
| style="text-align:center;"| 12 November 2003
| style="text-align:center;"| 17 December 2003
|-
| style="background:#FFA6C9; color:#FFA6C9; text-align:center;"| 
| style="text-align:center;"| 2
| style="text-align:center;"| 26
| style="text-align:center;"| 3 November 2006
| style="text-align:center;"| 7 March 2008
|}

Episodes

Series one (2003)

Series two (2006–2008)
 Caitlin Stasey reprises her role from the first season for one episode.

Lists of Australian children's television series episodes